For the 1990 Tokyo Indoor doubles Kevin Curren and David Pate were the defending champions, but Curren did not participate this year.  Pate partnered Scott Davis, losing in the final.

Guy Forget and Jakob Hlasek won the title, defeating Davis and Pate 7–6, 7–5 in the final.

Seeds
All seeds receive a bye into the second round.

Draw

Finals

Top half

Bottom half

References
Draw

Tennis tournaments in Japan
Tokyo Indoor
Tokyo Indoor